Thomasine Doreen Sansoni (11 October 1911 – 22 June 1977) was a Sri Lankan tennis player and national No. 1. She won a total of twenty eight career titles in singles, doubles and mixed doubles from 1935 to 1946. Adaptable at competing on two natural surfaces she won titles on both clay and grass courts. She remains the most successful Sri Lankan female player.

Tennis career
Sansoni began her tennis career in 1931. In April 1933 she reached the semi-finals of the national championships played at the Hill Club in Nuwara Eliya. She won her first singles at the Ceylon Championships in 1935. At the same event that year she earned the distinction of being the first female player to achieve the triple crown  by winning both the doubles and mixed doubles. In 1936 she successfully defended her Ceylon Championships  title and won the event a further five times, (1937-1940, 1946) her seven singles titles remain a national record she shares with British colonial player Mrs. G. D. H. (Tiny) Alston. In addition she won the Malayan Championships four straight times from 1936 to 1939. In December 1945 she won the singles title at the Bengal Championships in Calcutta, India defeating M. Nolan in straight sets. Her final title came at the All India Championships in January 1946 where she won the singles title, defeating Sarah Mody in three sets. Sansoni was also a successful doubles player, winning the Ceylon ladies doubles championships four times and the mixed doubles championship eight times, partnering with her cousin Hildon Sansoni. Her combined nineteen national titles remain a record. She won the Malayan Championships doubles title in 1936 and the mixed doubles title in 1938. She won the doubles title at the 1941 All India Championships in Baroda, partnering with Indian player Khanum Haji.

Playing style

Personal life
Sansoni was born in Negombo into a prominent Burgher family. Her father was Waldo Sansoni, (1883-1966 ), OBE, a former lieutenant colonel commanding the Ceylon Light Infantry regiment, who later became a district judge,  and her mother was Thomasin Gertrude Harriet Schrader, (1889-1941)  Sansoni had four siblings from her father's first marriage.

Career finals

Singles

References

Sources
 Altendorf, D. V. "GENEALOGY OF THE FAMILY OF SANSONI OF CEYLON VOL 49" (PDF). thedutchburgherunion.org. Sri Lankan Dutch Burgher Union. 1959.

External links
University of Adelaide Sri Lanka papers ca. 1800-1999
Sri Lanka Tennis Association (SLTA)
https://thuppahi.Dr. Michael Roberts/about

Sri Lankan female tennis players
1911 births
Year of death missing
People from Negombo
Sri Lankan people of Italian descent
Burgher sportspeople